Pseudopostega latifurcata is a moth of the family Opostegidae. It was described by Donald R. Davis and Jonas R. Stonis, 2007. It is known from Puerto Rico, the Virgin Islands, Dominica and Costa Rica.

The length of the forewings of ssp. latifurcata is 2.6–3 mm. Adults of this subspecies have been recorded from June to August. The length of the forewings of ssp. apoclina is 2.5–2.8 mm. Adults of this subspecies have been recorded in January, March, April, July and August.

Subspecies
Pseudopostega latifurcata latifurcata (Puerto Rico, the Virgin Islands and Dominica)
Pseudopostega latifurcata apoclina (Costa Rica)

Etymology
The specific name is derived from the Latin latus (meaning broad) and furcatus (meaning forked), as suggested by the broadly furcate gnathos diagnostic for this species. The subspecific name apoclina is derived from the Greek apoklines (meaning leaning, sloping) in reference to the dark brown fascia extending obliquely across the forewing.

References

Opostegidae
Moths described in 2007